BBC Radio Foyle is a BBC Northern Ireland local radio station, serving County Londonderry in Northern Ireland. It is named after the River Foyle which flows through Derry, the city where the station is based. The station broadcasts from BBC's Northland Road studios on 93.1 FM in Derry. It was available on 792 kHz MW until 6 May 2021.

There is also a small television studio based there used for interviews with the interviewee sitting in front of a CSO screen which normally has a live view of Derry. Since it broadcasts from a point close to the border between County Londonderry and County Donegal in the Republic of Ireland, it includes some coverage of the latter county.

It is an opt-out from BBC Radio's main Northern Ireland service, BBC Radio Ulster. BBC Radio Foyle's weekday schedule begins at 7:00am and continues until 4:00pm.

Programmes
Caschlár
Stephen McCauley (Electric Mainline) ("Afternoon Show")
The Breakfast Show
The Mark Patterson Show
News bulletins including sport, News at One and Sportsound
Rejoice
Stephen McCauley in the Afternoon
The Friday Show

Digital
BBC Radio Foyle is available online and is carried on Freeview in Northern Ireland (occupying the slot held by BBC Radio nan Gàidheal in Scotland and by BBC Radio Cymru in Wales). It was not initially available on DAB digital radio, however; the Northern Ireland multiplex licence only requires carriage of Radio Ulster.

In June 2010, the BBC announced a trial scheme under which Radio Foyle would be available on DAB as a part-time sidecar station to Radio Ulster, using a similar format as the part-time longwave-programming optouts of BBC Radio 4 on the BBC National DAB multiplex. During this trial, the bitrate of Radio Ulster would drop during Foyle's separate broadcast hours, with Foyle carried as a split audio stream in the remaining space; outside of split shows, the full bitrate would revert to Radio Ulster.

When the Digital One ensemble commenced broadcasting in Northern Ireland certain stations that used Digital One in the rest of the UK left the Northern Ireland ensemble, leaving space for Radio Foyle to broadcast in Stereo without the need for the Radio Ulster capacity to be split.

Following the closure of the medium wave services of BBC Radio Ulster and BBC Radio Foyle on 6 May 2021, the digital frequencies of BBC Radio Foyle have been used for split sports programming formerly broadcast on 1341 and 792 AM.

References

External links

Foyle
Mass media in Derry (city)
Radio stations established in 1979
Radio stations in Northern Ireland
BBC Northern Ireland
1979 establishments in Northern Ireland
Mass media in County Londonderry
Music in Derry (city)